Pseudomonas palleroniana is a Gram-negative bacterium that infects rice (Oryza sativa). The type strain is CFBP 4389.

References

External links
 Type strain of Pseudomonas palleroniana at BacDive -  the Bacterial Diversity Metadatabase

Pseudomonadales
Bacterial plant pathogens and diseases
Rice diseases
Bacteria described in 2002